Wanyūdō (literally "wheel (輪) monk (入道)"), also known as "Firewheel" or "Soultaker", is a yōkai depicted in Toriyama Sekien's collection of yōkai illustrations, Konjaku Gazu Zoku Hyakki. He is a relatively well-known yōkai; the earliest reports of him date back to the Heian period.

Description
Wanyūdō takes the form of a burning oxcart wheel bearing the tormented face of a man. Various folklore purports him as the condemned soul of a tyrannical daimyō who, in life, was known for having his victims drawn on the back of an oxcart. He is said to guard the gates of Hell, and to wander back and forth along the road between this world and the underworld, scaring townsfolk as he passes and stealing the souls of anyone who gets too close in order to bring them to Hell with him.

Legends
One of the most famous legends comes from Kyoto, Japan. As Wanyudo rolled throuh the town, a woman peeked out her window at him. Wanyudo told her "Instead of looking at me, have a look at your own child!"

She looked down at her baby to find him lying on the floor in a pool of blood with his legs missing.

When she looked back outside at the demon, she saw her baby's legs in his mouth as he ate them.

Modern appearances

Video games
 Yomawari – survival horror game for PlayStation 
 Megami Tensei – series of role-playing games
 Kenseiden – action RPG for Master System
 Ōkami – action-adventure game for PlayStation 2 (2006)
 Nioh – action RPG
 Demon Blade – Japanese Samurai RPG

Television and film
 Gegege no Kitaro – anime series (2018)
 Hell Girl – manga, anime, video game
 Kamen Rider – manga and anime series
 Gantz: O – CGI anime movie
 One Piece – manga and anime series (not included in the anime yet)
 Doron Dororon - manga 
 Toriko - manga; inspiration behind Mythical Beast "Soylent Mean"

See also
 Buer (demon), a similar creature from Christian mythology
 Ixion
 Japanese mythology

References

External links
 Statue of Wanyudo in Sakaiminato
 Review of 'The Great Youkai War' with pictures of Wanyudo
 Apkmoday

Yōkai
Mythological monsters